Ricky Santos (born April 26, 1984) is an American former gridiron football quarterback who is currently the head coach for the New Hampshire Wildcats football team. He played college football at New Hampshire, and was signed by the Kansas City Chiefs as an undrafted free agent in 2008.

Early years
Santos attended Bellingham High School in Bellingham, Massachusetts, and was a letterman in football, basketball, baseball, and track and field. In football, he was a two-time Tri-Valley League MVP, was twice named the Division V Player of the Year, a two-time MetroWest Player of the Year, and, as a senior, won all-State honors. In November 2002, during the first annual Thanksgiving Day game against Norton, he threw for seven touchdown passes, which is still one of the best high school performances in Bellingham history. He broke the state touchdown record and led his teams to two Massachusetts High School Super Bowl titles (2000 and 2001). He graduated from Bellingham High in 2003.

College career
Santos attended the University of New Hampshire and was a four-year starter at quarterback.  During his time, the Wildcats went a combined 37–14, winning one Atlantic 10 Football Conference Championship, two Northern Division Championships, and made the NCAA I-AA/FCS Playoffs all four seasons.  A three-time All-America selection, Santos won the Walter Payton Award in 2006, as the top offensive player in FCS (formerly Division I-AA).  Santos finished his college career third on the NCAA all-time career passing yardage list with 13,212 yards, and third on the NCAA all-time list for career touchdown passes with 123.  After the 2007 season, his no. 2 uniform number was retired by New Hampshire. In 2016, Santos was inducted to the university's athletic hall of fame.

Professional career
Kansas City Chiefs
After going undrafted in the 2008 NFL Draft, Santos agreed to join the Kansas City Chiefs as an undrafted free agent in May. However, he was released the same month.

Montreal Alouettes
In May 2008, Santos was signed by the Montreal Alouettes of the Canadian Football League.

Winnipeg Blue Bombers
On September 21, 2009, the Winnipeg Blue Bombers acquired Santos from the Montreal Alouettes in exchange for non-import defensive ends Riall Johnson and Shawn Mayne. He was released by the Blue Bombers on May 17, 2010.

Montreal Alouettes (second stint)
After an injury to Adrian McPherson, the Montreal Alouettes re-signed Santos on June 22, 2010 to serve as the third-string quarterback. On June 9, 2012, he was released by the Alouettes.

Toronto Argonauts
On June 16, 2012, Santos was signed by the Toronto Argonauts. He was released four days later.

Coaching career
Santos was quarterbacks coach for three seasons (2016–2018) with the Columbia Lions.

Santos joined the New Hampshire coaching staff in March 2019, as associate head coach and quarterbacks coach. When Wildcats head coach Sean McDonnell took a leave of absence for health reasons in late August 2019, Santos was named interim head coach for the team. The 2019 Wildcats finished with a record of 6–5. McDonnell returned to the team for the 2020 season, with Santos resuming his role as associate head coach and quarterbacks coach. McDonnell retired on December 1, 2021; the following week, Santos was formally named the next head football coach for the Wildcats.

Personal life
Ricky Santos is the husband of Ulyana Santos and father to a daughter and a son. Santos is a cousin of racecar driver Bobby Santos III.

Head coaching record

References

External links
 New Hampshire profile
 Montreal Alouettes profile

1984 births
Living people
American football quarterbacks
American people of Portuguese descent
American players of Canadian football
Canadian football quarterbacks
Columbia Lions football coaches
Kansas City Chiefs players
New Hampshire Wildcats football coaches
New Hampshire Wildcats football players
Winnipeg Blue Bombers players
High school football coaches in Massachusetts
Walter Payton Award winners
People from Norwood, Massachusetts
Players of American football from Massachusetts